The 2010 British Formula Ford Championship was the 35th edition of the British Formula Ford Championship. It commenced on 5 April at Oulton Park's Easter Monday meeting and ended on 26 September at Brands Hatch after 10 rounds and 25 races, held in the United Kingdom and the Netherlands.

Jamun Racing continued their recent domination of the championship, with Scott Pye securing the team's sixth successive drivers' championship. From the 25 races held during the season, Pye won twelve of them, claiming four fastest laps as well as equalling 2007 champion Callum MacLeod's record of 17 pole positions in a season, including pole positions in the last nine races. Pye, who had moved to the UK championship having previously been a multiple race-winner in the Australian Formula Ford Championship, came on top after a season-long battle with Cliff Dempsey Racing's Scott Malvern. Malvern, who had previously been a part of the Jamun team working as a mechanic for 2008 runner-up Tim Blanchard, won only two races during the season but with 22 top-five finishes, he outscored Pye by a solitary point on total scores. This consistency would eventually cost Malvern as a driver's worst two scores had to be dropped per the championship regulations. Malvern had to drop 20 points from a twelfth-place finish at Knockhill – slowed after a collision with Pye's Jamun team-mate Josh Hill – and a tenth place at Donington Park, whereas Pye did not have to drop points due to three retirements over the season – via first-lap incidents at Oulton Park and Knockhill, and a clash with Malvern at Donington – meaning that Pye emerged as champion by 19 points.

Daniel Cammish took third place in the championship standings, having started the season in Kevin Mills Racing's Spectrum and ended it as a twice race-winner, at the wheel of one of JTR's trio of Mygales. His team-mate Tio Ellinas finished the season fourth in the standings, taking three victories in his first season of car racing, having been selected via the Grand Prix Shootout programme. Hill, son of  Formula One world champion Damon Hill, completed the top five placings, just seven points behind Ellinas with five victories; Ellinas moving ahead of Hill after victory in the final round of the season at Brands Hatch. The only other driver to win a race was Danish driver Dennis Lind, who won one of the races at the overseas round at Zandvoort, in support of the Formula 3 Masters race. Lind also won the end-of-season, non-championship Formula Ford Festival race.

Tristan Mingay won the Scholarship Class championship for older machinery, beating his only other full-season rival Luke Williams by 76 points. Both drivers won the class on eleven occasions, but with more finishes, Mingay held a comfortable margin and duly claimed the title with a race to spare. The other Grand Prix Shootout winner, Dani Domit finished third in the championship, taking a double win at Zandvoort before leaving the championship after the following round at Castle Combe. David Ellesley took the other victory during the season, at Oulton Park. Despite being in his first season of car racing and so eligible to race in the Scholarship Class, Tio Ellinas opted not to do so. Had he done so, he would have won 21 of the 25 races.

Mygale held off Ray for the constructors' championship, Jamun Racing won the teams' championship comfortably, while Pye's results gave Australia the Nations Cup.

Drivers and teams

Race calendar and results
The series supported the British Formula 3 Championship/British GT Championship package at six rounds – Formula Three does not run at Knockhill – as well as supporting the British Touring Car Championship at Donington Park, the Deutsche Tourenwagen Masters at Brands Hatch and being part of the Masters of Formula 3 meeting at Zandvoort. Castle Combe was a stand-alone event for the series, held mid-season.

Championship standings
In the Championship Class, points were awarded on a 30-27-24-22-20-18-16-14-12-10-8-6-4-3-2 basis to the top fifteen classified drivers, with one point awarded to all other finishers. In the Scholarship Class, points were awarded 30-27-24-22-20-18-16-14-12-10-8-6-4-2-1 basis. An additional point was given to the driver – with the exception of Oulton Park race three, where Scott Pye and Scott Malvern were each given a point after setting identical fastest laps – who set the fastest lap in each race, in both classes. Each driver's best 23 scores counted towards the championship both in the Championship class and the Scholarship class.

Championship Class

Scholarship Class

Constructors

Teams

Nations Cup

References

External links
 The home of the British Formula Ford Championship

British Formula Ford Championship seasons
Formula Ford Championship
British Formula Ford